Orrin Henry Ingram Sr. (June 26, 1904 – April 25, 1963) was an American heir and businessman.

Early life
Orrin Henry Ingram Sr. was born on June 26, 1904, in Eau Claire, Wisconsin. His father, Erskine B. Ingram, was a lumber heir. His mother was Harriet Coggshall. His parents were members of the Congregational Church.

His paternal grandfather three times removed, David Ingram, had immigrated from Leeds, England, in 1780. His paternal grandfather, Orrin Henry Ingram, was a lumber baron in Wisconsin. His great-uncle, Julius Ingram, was a member of the Wisconsin State Assembly.

Career
In 1928, Ingram ran a textile firm in Tennessee owned by his wife's family. He relocated it to Nashville, Tennessee. By 1937, at the time of the textile strike, he sold half his investment and acquired Wood River Oil and Refining, an oil company based in St. Louis, Missouri.

He was the owner of Ingram Oil & Refining, a chain of 240 gas stations headquartered in Meraux, Louisiana, just outside New Orleans. In 1961, he sold the company to Murphy Oil.

Philanthropy
Ingram served as the Vice President of the Board of Trust of Vanderbilt University in Nashville from 1952 to 1963.

Personal life
Ingram married Hortense Bigelow, the daughter of the president of the St. Paul Fire and Marine Insurance Co. (later known as The Travelers Companies). They resided in White Bear Lake, Minnesota, Hobe Sound, Florida, and Nashville, Tennessee. They had two sons, E. Bronson Ingram II and Frederic B. Ingram, and a daughter, Alice, who married Henry William Hooker.

Death and legacy
He died of a heart attack on April 25, 1963, in Nashville, Tennessee. He was buried at Mount Olivet Cemetery in Nashville.

The Hank Ingram House on the campus of Vanderbilt University was named in his honor in 2006.

References

External links
 (Nashville grave)
 (Eau Claire cenotaph)

1904 births
1963 deaths
People from Eau Claire, Wisconsin
People from Nashville, Tennessee
People from Hobe Sound, Florida
American people of English descent
American company founders
Businesspeople from Tennessee
American businesspeople in the oil industry
Vanderbilt University people
Ingram family
20th-century American businesspeople
People from White Bear Lake, Minnesota